Gage and Tollner is a restaurant on 372 Fulton Street in the Downtown Brooklyn neighborhood of New York City. It had been in business since 1879 and in the same location since 1892 until it closed on February 14, 2004. The restaurant reopened in April 2021.

The building, originally a residence, has been in existence since 1875. It is listed on the National Register of Historic Places and is a New York City designated landmark.

History

Early years 
The structure which housed the restaurant was built about 1875, originally as a private residence, and is a four-story late Italianate style brownstone building. The painted wood storefront was probably added in 1892 when the restaurant opened. It includes a portico with modified Doric order columns. The interior retains the original Victorian design including Lincrusta-Walton wall covering.

Gage and Tollner's began when Charles Gage opened an "eating house" at 303 Fulton Street, Brooklyn, in 1879. In 1880, Eugene Tollner joined him and the restaurant became known as Gage and Tollner's in 1882. Tollner was the son of Charles Tollner, the founder of the hardware store that subsequently became  Hammacher Schlemmer under the ownership of Eugene Tollner's cousin William Schlemmer. The restaurant moved to 372–374 Fulton Street in 1892. It attracted customers like Diamond Jim Brady, Jimmy Durante and Mae West.

Gage and Tollner retired in 1911 and sold the restaurant to A.H. Cunningham and Alexander Ingalls, with the provision that neither the interior nor the name be changed. They sold the restaurant eight years later to Seth Bradford Dewey. The Deweys bought the entire building in 1923 and continued to run the business until 1985. Despite the ownership changes, Charles Gage and Eugene Tollner continued to work at the restaurant until their deaths in 1920 and 1935, respectively. During the 1950s, the restaurant referred to the colder weather months as "turtle soup weather". The restaurant would procure live turtles and prepare its own recipe.  The restaurant refused to serve black customers until 1960.

Decline and closure 
The restaurant began to decline in 1976. Fulton Street was turned into a pedestrian mall and taxis were unable to drop off diners at the front door. In the 1980s the restaurant and building was bought by Peter Aschkenasy who brought in famed chef Edna Lewis.  She expanded the restaurant's menu by adding her famed Southern cuisine, such as cornbread, catfish and a "legendary she-crab soup". However the surrounding neighborhood had also changed – “the restaurant struggled because of its location on down-market Fulton Mall, which was deserted and grim after dark; Aschkenasy says he could not even attract people from the Heights.” The restaurant went bankrupt in 1995 and was purchased by Joseph Chirico, a reputed member of the Gambino crime family Valet parking was tried but even that did not bring in enough customers to sustain the business. The restaurant closed on February 14, 2004.

Shortly after it closed, T.G.I. Friday's moved in. T.G.I. Friday's vacated the space in 2007.  After gaining interior design approval from the New York City Landmarks Preservation Commission, an Arby's franchise, owned by Raymond Chera, opened at the location on January 21, 2010. In August 2010, the Arby's franchise closed. As of 2012 the space was inhabited by a discount costume jewelry and leather coats store. Most of the antique fixtures had disappeared or been covered up by modern lighting and fixtures.

Revival
In 2018, a crowdfunding initiative to restore the restaurant to its former glory was announced. In July 2018, The New York Times reported that restaurateurs St. John Frizell, Sohui Kim, and Ben Schneider were trying to revive the restaurant.  It has been reported that it won’t be “something newfangled but as an old-school house of chops and oysters.”

In January 2019, it was announced that Frizell, Kim and Schneider signed the lease with landlord William Jemal “after ‘hitting the numbers’ in December.” They were not sure whether to keep the name, and plans for the site had to be approved by the Landmarks Preservation Commission and the community board. On their crowdfunding page, they said they wanted “a 70-seat dining room, a 40-seat bar area, two combinable private dining rooms seating up to 60, and a separate 30-seat tropical cocktail bar upstairs.” A new outdoor "Gage & Tollner" sign was erected in January 2020.  The grand re-opening was announced for March 15, 2020, but was postponed just days before opening with the onset of the COVID-19 pandemic in New York City. The restaurant officially reopened on April 15, 2021. Frizell, Schneider, and Kim had postponed the reopening until restrictions on indoor dining capacity were decreased and COVID-19 vaccinations were available for restaurant workers.

Interior
It has 36 light fixtures which had both gas piping and electrical wiring when installed in 1888. The new restaurant, however, does not use gas. Cherry framed mirrors and tables made of mahogany.

Beginning in late 1995, Chirico made some renovations and closed down the restaurant until April or May 1996.  He said "he has tried to retain the historic flavor of the restaurant while providing modern amenities."

The building was listed on the National Register of Historic Places in 1982.  The New York City Landmarks Preservation Commission designated the interior a landmark in 1975; it is among the earliest interior landmarks to be designated, after the New York Public Library Main Branch and Grant's Tomb.

Reviews
"Milford Prewitt, a former writer and editor for Nation’s Restaurant News, described the restaurant as one of the most “romantic dining environments in the city, contributing to its ranking as one of the top restaurants for marriage proposals.” Or, as L.J. Davis wrote in an essay in the nostalgic anthology Brooklyn: A State of Mind, “You go to Gage’s (as many regulars call it) for the experience, the way you go to heaven for the climate and to hell for the company.”"

After the 2021 reopening, the New York Times restaurant critic, Pete Wells, wrote that "everything about this reincarnation glows... the whole restaurant radiates confidence, capability and relevance."

See also
List of New York City Landmarks
National Register of Historic Places listings in Kings County, New York

References

External links

 Landmarks Preservation Commission Designation Report
 Landmarks Preservation Commission Designation Report (Interior)

Commercial buildings on the National Register of Historic Places in New York City
Restaurants in Brooklyn
Italianate architecture in New York City
Commercial buildings completed in 1875
Restaurants established in 1879
Restaurants disestablished in 2004
Downtown Brooklyn
National Register of Historic Places in Brooklyn
Restaurants on the National Register of Historic Places
New York City Designated Landmarks in Brooklyn
New York City interior landmarks
Steakhouses in New York City